The Pit Stop Challenge is a single elimination, pit stop competition held on Carb Day of the Indianapolis 500 at the Indianapolis Motor Speedway since 1977. Pit crews compete head-to-head in single-round eliminations for three rounds, during which they are mandated to conduct a standard pit stop of switching all four tires on a racing vehicle and simulating refuelling via a fuel hose connection to the fuel tank in the shortest possible time in a drag race-style event, beginning with a driver bringing their car into the pit box and stopping there. Previously, tire fitting was restricted to a racing car's right-hand side. During the competition, no fuel is used. The time a team's car spends in its pit box determines the winner, and the fastest team in each pairing advances to the next round. Squads may be assessed time penalties if they exit their pit box with an incorrectly fitted tire, if pit crews or equipment leave their designated area, or if a driver runs over pit equipment such as an air hose. 

Since 2017, the top two teams have competed in a three-round final. The team with the fastest time in the semi-finals gets to select their preferred lane for the final, and the team with the fastest time in the final gets to choose their favored lane for the third and deciding round. The tournament bracket is decided by a blind draw, and the top four teams receive a bye from the first round to the quarter-finals, with the remaining squads beginning in the first round. Contest participants are selected from IndyCar Series-registered teams and Indianapolis 500 entrants. Qualification for the contest is based on pit stop performance after the last Indianapolis 500, current season IndyCar entrant standings positions, and one-off Indianapolis 500 entries. The winning team receives $50,000 from $100,000 total prize money, and crew members receive pit lane equipment from prize donors at a Gasoline Alley giveaway.

Pit crews can adjust their routines, practise to reduce errors, and become acquainted with their pit lane box thanks to the competition. It was cancelled in 2008 due to rain, and all advertized prize monies were donated to charity; it was also cancelled in both 2020 and 2021 because of the COVID-19 pandemic in Indiana. , the record for the most victories is held by Team Penske with 18 wins since their first win in the 1981 final. Galles Racing are in second place with six wins, and Chip Ganassi Racing are third with three victories. Hélio Castroneves has the most victories among drivers, with eight, followed by Danny Sullivan with four wins. Rick Rinaman has four wins, more than any other chief mechanic. Travis Law, Matt Jonsson, Owen Snyder, and Travis Law follow in second place with three victories each. The inaugural winner was Carrillo (Jim McElreath) in the 1977 final, while the most recent winner was Team Penske (Josef Newgarden) in the 2022 final.

Winners and runner-ups

Statistics

Notes

Bibliography

References

External links

Indianapolis 500